Prawobrzeże (lit. Right Bank) is one of four districts (Polish: dzielnica) of Szczecin, Poland situated on the right bank of Oder river in eastern part of the city. As of December 2019 it had a population of 81,027.

Prawobrzeże is divided into 11 municipal neighbourhoods: 
 Bukowe-Klęskowo
 Dąbie
 Kijewo
 Majowe
 Płonia-Śmierdnica-Jezierzyce
 Podjuchy
 Słoneczne
 Wielgowo-Sławociesze
 Załom
 Zdroje
 Żydowce-Klucz

References

Neighbourhoods of Szczecin